Paolo Bossini (born 29 June 1985 in Villa Carcina, Brescia) is an Italian breaststroke swimmer. He was European Champion in 2004, both short and long course, in 200 m breaststroke. He achieved the 4th place in the same distance in the 2004 Summer Olympics. He lives in Switzerland at the moment.

See also
 Swimming at the 2004 Summer Olympics – Men's 200 metre breaststroke
 Swimming at the 2004 Summer Olympics – Men's 4 × 100 metre medley relay
 European SC Championships 2004
 European LC Championships 2004
 European SC Championships 2005
 2006 European Championships in Aquatics
 European Short Course Swimming Championships 2006

References
 Paolo Bossini on agendadiana.com
 Paolo Bossini on Italian Swimming Federation's website
 Paolo Bossini on nuotopedia.eu

1985 births
Living people
Sportspeople from the Province of Brescia
Italian male swimmers
Italian male breaststroke swimmers
Olympic swimmers of Italy
Swimmers at the 2004 Summer Olympics
Swimmers at the 2008 Summer Olympics
European Aquatics Championships medalists in swimming

Mediterranean Games silver medalists for Italy
Swimmers at the 2005 Mediterranean Games
Mediterranean Games medalists in swimming
20th-century Italian people
21st-century Italian people